Sylvia is a 2006 novel by Australian author Bryce Courtenay. It is written as the memoir of a teenage girl, Sylvia Honeyeater, during the Children's Crusade of the 13th century. She encounters several historical figures such as the Pied Piper of Hamelin and Francis of Assisi. It explores themes of religious intolerance, womanhood, abuse and childhood.

External links 
 Bryce Courtenay official website
 Fantasticfiction Sylvia entry

2006 novels
Novels by Bryce Courtenay
Novels set during the Crusades
Fiction set in the 1210s
Viking Press books
Novels set in the 13th century